List of ambassadors of Russia may refer to:

List of ambassadors of Russia and the Soviet Union to Afghanistan
List of ambassadors of Russia to Albania
List of ambassadors of Russia to Algeria
List of ambassadors of Russia to Angola
List of ambassadors of Russia to Antigua and Barbuda
List of ambassadors of Russia to Argentina
List of ambassadors of Russia to Armenia
List of ambassadors of Russia to Australia
List of ambassadors of Russia to Austria
List of ambassadors of Russia to Azerbaijan
List of ambassadors of Russia to Bahrain
List of ambassadors of Russia to Bangladesh
List of ambassadors of Russia to Belarus
List of ambassadors of Russia to Belgium
List of ambassadors of Russia to Belize
List of ambassadors of Russia to Benin
List of ambassadors of Russia to Bolivia
List of ambassadors of Russia to Bosnia and Herzegovina
List of ambassadors of Russia to Botswana
List of ambassadors of Russia to Brazil
List of ambassadors of Russia to Brunei
List of ambassadors of Russia to Bulgaria
List of ambassadors of Russia to Burkina Faso
List of ambassadors of Russia to Burundi
List of ambassadors of Russia to Cambodia
List of ambassadors of Russia to Canada
List of ambassadors of Russia to China
List of ambassadors of Russia to Croatia
List of ambassadors of Russia to Cyprus
List of ambassadors of Russia to the Czech Republic
List of ambassadors of Russia to Denmark
List of ambassadors of Russia to Ecuador
List of ambassadors of Russia to Egypt
List of ambassadors of Russia to Estonia
List of ambassadors of Russia to Ethiopia
List of ambassadors of Russia to Finland
List of ambassadors of Russia to France
List of ambassadors of Russia to India
List of ambassadors of Russia to Indonesia
List of ambassadors of Russia to Iran
List of ambassadors of Russia to Iraq
List of ambassadors of Russia to Ireland
List of ambassadors of Russia to Israel
List of ambassadors of Russia to Italy
List of ambassadors of Russia to Ivory Coast
List of ambassadors of Russia to Japan
List of ambassadors of Russia to Jordan
List of ambassadors of Russia to Latvia
List of ambassadors of Russia to Luxembourg
List of ambassadors of Russia to Malta
List of ambassadors of Russia to Mauritania
List of ambassadors of Russia to Myanmar
List of ambassadors of Russia to New Zealand
List of ambassadors of Russia to Nigeria
List of ambassadors of Russia to North Korea
List of ambassadors of Russia to Pakistan
List of ambassadors of Russia to Peru
List of ambassadors of Russia to the Philippines
List of ambassadors of Russia to Poland
List of ambassadors of Russia to Romania
List of ambassadors of Russia to Rwanda
List of Ambassadors of Russia to Saudi Arabia
List of ambassadors of Russia to Seychelles
List of ambassadors of Russia to Singapore
List of ambassadors of Russia to Slovakia
List of ambassadors of Russia to South Korea
List of ambassadors of Russia to Sudan
List of ambassadors of Russia to Syria
List of ambassadors of Russia to Thailand
List of ambassadors of Russia to Tunisia
List of ambassadors of Russia to Turkey
List of ambassadors of Russia to the Holy See
List of ambassadors of Russia to the United Arab Emirates
List of ambassadors of Russia to the United Kingdom
List of ambassadors of Russia to the United States
List of ambassadors of Russia to Uruguay
List of ambassadors of Russia to Uzbekistan
List of ambassadors of Russia to Vanuatu
List of ambassadors of Russia to Vietnam
List of ambassadors of Russia to Yugoslavia

Lists of ambassadors by country of origin
 
Ambassadors